Skogbygda may refer to the following locations:

Skogbygda, Akershus, a village in Nes municipality in Akershus county, Norway
Skogbygda, Løten, a village in Løten municipality in Innlandet county, Norway
Skogbygda, Sel, a village in Sel municipality in Innlandet county, Norway